The Tunisia Olympic football team, nicknamed Les Aigles de Carthage (The Eagles of Carthage or The Carthage Eagles), is the national under-23 football team of Tunisia and is controlled by the Tunisian Football Federation, represents Tunisia in international football competitions and in the Olympic Games, Africa U-23 Cup of Nations and UNAF U-23 Tournament. The selection is limited to players under the age of 23, except during the Olympic Games where the use of three overage players is allowed.

History 
Tunisia first appeared in the final of the Summer Olympics held in Rome in 1960.

Results and fixtures

2022

Players

Current squad 
The following players were called up for a Friendly match against  on 25 and 28 March 2022.

Recent call-ups 

 

INJ Player withdrew from the squad due to an injury.
PRE Preliminary squad.
SUS Player is serving a suspension.
WD Player withdrew for personal reasons.

Notable players 
 Ali Zitouni

Previous squads 
 Tunisia Olympic Squads 
 1960 Summer Olympics squads – Tunisia
 1988 Summer Olympics squads – Tunisia
 1996 Summer Olympics squads – Tunisia
 2004 Summer Olympics squads – Tunisia
 Tunisia CAF U23 Squads 
2015 Africa U-23 Cup of Nations squads – Tunisia

Overage players in Olympic Games

Honours 

Mediterranean Games:
   Champions: 2001
   Runners up: 1971
   Third Place: 1975
   Third Place: 2013
All-Africa Games:
  Silver Medalist: 1991
  Bronze Medalist: 2007
UNAF U-23 Tournament:
  Runners up: 2007

Competitive record 
 Champions   Runners-up   Third place   Fourth place

Red border color indicates tournament was held on home soil.

Olympic Games record

All-Africa Games record

U-23 Africa Cup of Nations record

Mediterranean Games

Pan Arab Games

UNAF U-23 Tournament record

See also 
 Tunisia national football team
 Tunisia A' national football team
 Tunisia national under-20 football team
 Tunisia national under-17 football team
 Tunisia national under-15 football team

References

External links 

 
African national under-23 association football teams
under-23